The Thrum Mill is a grade II-listed water mill in Rothbury, Northumberland, England. The water mill dates back to 1665.

Media 
The renovation of Thrum Mill by locals Dave and Margaret Heldey into a home was featured on The Restoration Man (2010–present), a home improvement show presented by architect George Clarke, in Series 3: Episode 4 (2014). Clarke's revisiting of the mill a year later was shown in Series 4: Episode Eight (2015).

Gallery

References

Grade II listed houses
Rothbury